The following is a list of association football stadiums in Latvia, ordered by capacity. The largest stadium in the country is currently the Daugava Stadium, first opened in 1972, which can hold up to 10,461 people.

For practical purposes, the list only includes stadiums with a capacity of 500 or above.

Current stadiums

See also

List of European stadiums by capacity
List of association football stadiums by capacity

External links 

 Stadiums in Latvia

 
Latvia
Football stadiums
Football stadiums